Local elections were held in the province of Laguna on May 9, 2022, as part of the 2022 Philippine general election. Voters selected candidates for all local positions: a town mayor, vice mayor and town council, as well as members of the Sangguniang Panlalawigan, the vice-governor, governor, and representatives for the four districts of Laguna, and the lone districts of Biñan, Calamba, and the newly created lone district for Santa Rosa.

Incumbents Ramil Hernandez and Katherine Agapay were re-elected to the governorship and the vice governorship respectively, defeating their closest opponents Representative Sol Aragones and actor Jerico Ejercito.

Coalitions 

As the governor, vice governor, and members of the House of Representatives and the Provincial Board are elected on the same ballot, gubernatorial candidates may present a slate of candidates for each position for every district within the province.

Administration coalition

Primary opposition coalition

Provincial elections

Governor

Incumbent Governor Ramil Hernandez sought a third and final term. His main opponent was incumbent Representative Sol Aragones.

Results By City and Municipality

Vice governor

Incumbent Vice Governor Katherine Agapay sought a third and final term. Her main opponent was actor Jerico Ejercito, the son of former Governor ER Ejercito.

Provincial board
Unlike in congressional elections, the districts for the Laguna Provincial Board still have Biñan and Santa Rosa included in the 1st district, and Calamba in the 2nd district.

1st District
Cities: Biñan, Santa Rosa City, San Pedro City

|-
| colspan="5" style="background:black;" |

2nd district
Cities: Cabuyao, Calamba
Municipalities: Bay, Los Baños

|-
| colspan="5" style="background:black;" |

3rd District
City: San Pablo City
Municipalities: Alaminos, Calauan, Liliw. Nagcarlan, Rizal, Victoria

|-
| colspan="5" style="background:black;" |

4th District
Municipalities: Cavinti, Famy, Kalayaan, Luisiana, Lumban, Mabitac, Magdalena, Majayjay, Paete, Pagsanjan, Pakil, Pangil, Pila, Santa Cruz, Santa Maria, Siniloan

|-
| colspan="5" style="background:black;" |

Congressional elections

1st District 
Incumbent Dan Fernandez is running in the newly created Lone District of Santa Rosa. Former board member Dave Almarinez and incumbent board member Ann Matibag are the notable candidates for the redistricted seat.

2nd District 
Ruth Mariano-Hernandez is the incumbent. Her opponent is former PAGCOR Chief Efraim Genuino.

3rd District 
Incumbent Sol Aragones is term-limited and is running for governor. Incumbent San Pablo mayor Loreto Amante will run for the position. His opponents are actress and incumbent board member Angelica Jones, Maria Cristina Villamor and King Mediano.

4th District 
Incumbent Benjamin Agarao Jr. is term-limited and will run for Mayor of Santa Cruz. His daughter Jam, an incumbent board member, is his party's nominee. Her opponent is former Santa Maria mayor Antonio Carolino.

Biñan 
Marlyn Alonte-Naguiat is the incumbent. Her opponent is Mike Yatco.

Calamba 
Incumbent Joaquin Chipeco, Jr. is term-limited. His son, incumbent Mayor Justin Marc Chipeco is his party's nominee. His opponents are incumbent Councilor Charisse Anne Hernandez and Emerson Panganiban.

Santa Rosa 
Incumbent 1st district representative Dan Fernandez is running in this district. He will face former councilor Petronio "Boy" Factoriza Jr.

City and municipal elections
All cities and municipalities of Laguna will elect a mayor and a vice-mayor this election. The candidates for mayor and vice mayor with the highest number of votes wins the seat; they are voted separately, therefore, they may be of different parties when elected. Below is the list of mayoralty candidates of each city and municipalities per district.

1st District
City: San Pedro City

San Pedro City
Incumbent Lourdes Cataquiz is term-limited. His son, Aaron will run for Mayor. His opponent is Vice Mayor Art Joseph Francis Mercado.

2nd District
City: Cabuyao
Municipality: Bay, Los Baños

Cabuyao

Bay

Los Baños
Incumbent Antonio Kalaw, who assumed office after the assassination of Mayor Caesar Perez, is running his first full three-year term.

3rd District
City: San Pablo City
Municipality: Alaminos, Calauan, Liliw. Nagcarlan, Rizal, Victoria

San Pablo City
Incumbent Loreto Amante is term-limited and is running for congressman. His father, incumbent City Administrator and former Mayor Vicente Amante is his party's nominee. His opponent is former board member in 3rd district Laguna Arcadio Gapangada, Jr.

Alaminos
Incumbent Ruben Alvarez, who assumed office upon the death of Mayor Eladio Magampon, is running his first full three-year term.

Calauan
Incumbent Buenifrido Berris is term-limited.

Liliw
Incumbent Ericson Sulibit is term-limited.

Nagcarlan

Rizal

Victoria

4th District
Municipalities: Cavinti, Famy, Kalayaan, Luisiana, Lumban, Mabitac, Magdalena, Majayjay, Paete, Pagsanjan, Pakil, Pangil, Pila, Santa Cruz, Santa Maria, Siniloan

Cavinti

Famy

Kalayaan

Luisiana

Lumban

Mabitac

Magdalena
Incumbent Mayor David Aventurado Jr. is term-limited. Incumbent Vice Mayor Pedro Bucal will run for Mayor.

Majayjay

Paete
Incumbent mayor Rojilyn Bagabaldo is term-limited and is running for Vice Mayor. Incumbent Vice Mayor Aurelio Paraiso is running in his place. His opponents include former Mayor Elmoise Afurong, Brgy. Ibaba del Norte Captain Efren Capco, former Municipal Administrator Ronald Cosico, former Councilor Lourdes Sunga, former mayoral candidate Marceliano Cadayona, basketball coach Johny Tam, and independent bets Andres Caguin and Alejandro Garcia.

Pagsanjan
Incumbent Peter Casius Trinidad is running for reelection. His opponent is former mayor and incumbent vice mayor Girlie Ejercito.

Pakil

Pangil

Pila

Santa Cruz

Incumbent Egay San Luis is running for reelection against Incumbent 4th District Congressman Benjamin Agarao Jr..

Incumbent Laarni A. Malibiran is running for reelection against her predecessor Incumbent Councilor and Former Vice Mayor Louie De Leon.
 

 

|-
| colspan="5" style="background:#000000;" |
|-

Santa Maria

Siniloan

Biñan
Incumbent Arman Dimaguila is running for reelection against Bobet Borja and Former Councilor Donna Yatco.

Calamba

Incumbent Timmy Chipeco is term-limited and is running for congressman. His brother, incumbent councilor Joey Chipeco is his party's nominee. His opponents are former governor and former Pagsanjan Mayor ER Ejercito and incumbent Vice Mayor Roseller Rizal.

Incumbent Roseller Rizal is term-limited and is running for mayor. His party nominated incumbent councilor Angelito ‘Totie’ Lazaro, Jr. His opponent is incumbent councilor Soliman Rajay Lajara.

Santa Rosa City
2022 Santa Rosa Local Elections

Incumbent mayor Arlene Arcillas is running for reelection. She will face incumbent vice mayor Arnel Gomez. Meanwhile, former vice mayor Arnold Arcillas will run for vice mayor.

References 

2022 Philippine local elections
Elections in Laguna (province)
2022 elections in Calabarzon